Fernand Rigaux (1905 – 21 September 1962) was a Belgian astronomer and observer of variable stars, minor planets and comets at the Royal Observatory at Uccle, Belgium.

In 1951, he co-discovered the periodic comet 49P/Arend-Rigaux with his colleague Sylvain Arend. He is also credited by the Minor Planet Center with the discovery of 8 asteroids between 1933 and 1941.

The asteroid 19911 Rigaux, discovered by himself at Uccle in 1933, was named in his memory. Naming citation was published on 25 December 2015.

References
 

1905 births
1962 deaths
20th-century Belgian astronomers
Discoverers of asteroids